Vimal Mundada ( – 22 March 2012) was an Indian politician from Maharashtra belonging to the Nationalist Congress Party (NCP). During 2004–09, she was minister of Minister of Public Works and Minister for Health in the Government of Maharashtra.

Political career
Dr. Vimaltai Nandkishore Mundada began her political career in 1990 the Bharatiya Janata Party (BJP). She was elected as member of Maharashtra Legislative Assembly from Kaij, a seat reserved for scheduled caste candidates in Beed district. She won the same seat three times after joining the Nationalist Congress Party NCP.

Death
Former Maharashtra minister Vimal Mundada died on 22 March 2012.

References

Maharashtra MLAs 2004–2009
2012 deaths
Nationalist Congress Party politicians from Maharashtra
1963 births
Maharashtra MLAs 2009–2014
Maharashtra MLAs 1990–1995
Maharashtra MLAs 1995–1999
Maharashtra MLAs 1999–2004
Marathi politicians
Bharatiya Janata Party politicians from Maharashtra
20th-century Indian women politicians
20th-century Indian politicians
21st-century Indian women politicians
21st-century Indian politicians
Women members of the Maharashtra Legislative Assembly